Ashenafi Bekele (Amharic: አሸናፊ በቀለ) is an Ethiopian football team manager who currently is the manager of Hadiya Hossana F.C.

History 
In February 2017, he was appointed as coach of the Ethiopia national football team. Bekele returned to Adama City as manager in July 2019.

References

Living people
Ethiopia national football team managers
Year of birth missing (living people)
Ethiopian football managers
Dire Dawa City S.C. managers